Mikhail Yuryevich Tynyany (born 22 May 1989) is a former Russian professional football player.

Club career
He played 3 seasons in the Russian Football National League for FC KAMAZ Naberezhnye Chelny, FC Torpedo Moscow and FC Tambov.

External links
 
 

1989 births
People from Tambovsky District, Tambov Oblast
Living people
Russian footballers
Association football forwards
FC Spartak Tambov players
FC KAMAZ Naberezhnye Chelny players
FC Gornyak Uchaly players
FC Torpedo Moscow players
FC Tambov players
Sportspeople from Tambov Oblast